Camerobiidae is a family of mites.

References 

Raphignathoidea
Acari families